The Palace and the Majestic are a pair of historic performance and film venues at 1315-1357 Main Street in downtown Bridgeport, Connecticut.  Built in 1921-22 by Sylvester Z. Poli in a single building that also housed a hotel, they were in their heyday a posh and opulent sight, designed by noted theater architect Thomas W. Lamb.  The building has stood vacant and decaying since the 1970s, despite repeated attempts to restore its grandeur.  The building was listed on the National Register of Historic Places in 1979.

Description
The Palace/Majestic building is located at the northern end of Bridgeport's downtown area, its main facade occupying an entire block of Main Street between Congress and Arch Streets.  It is a five-story building, built out of steel and reinforced concrete, with an elegant Beaux Arts exterior.  The exterior is a combination of brick and concrete finished to resemble granite on the main facade, and mainly brick on the other sides.  The interior is organized with the hotel in the front portion of the building, and the theaters side by side in the rear.  The Palace Theater, on the left, has an original seating capacity of 3700, while the Majestic seated 2600.

History
The complex was the inspiration of theater mogul Sylvester Z. Poli, who built a chain of vaudeville theaters across the northeastern United States in the late 19th and early 20th centuries.  Poli hired the well-known theater architect Thomas W. Lamb, then at his creative peak, to design the structure.  The theater bears some resemblance to another Poli/Lamb collaboration, the Palace Theater in Waterbury, Connecticut, also completed in 1922.  The hotel built on top of the theaters was originally intended to cater to the traveling shows that played there and others associated with the performers.  The theaters originally showed live vaudeville performance, but eventually transitioned to showing movies.  The Palace was purchased by Loew's in 1934, and was known for a time as "Loew's Poli Theater".

When Bridgeport's factories began to close in the 1960s and 1970s, the fortunes of the complex declined, and both theaters closed in the late 1970s.  The entire building has stood vacant since then; there have been recurring efforts to restore it to its former glory.

See also
National Register of Historic Places listings in Bridgeport, Connecticut

References

National Register of Historic Places in Fairfield County, Connecticut
Buildings and structures completed in 1922
Movie palaces
Theatres on the National Register of Historic Places in Connecticut
Theatres completed in 1922
Beaux-Arts architecture in Connecticut
Theatres in Connecticut
Buildings and structures in Bridgeport, Connecticut
1922 establishments in Connecticut
Thomas W. Lamb buildings